Boot Lake is a lake in Anoka County, Minnesota, in the United States.

Boot Lake was so named for its outline is said to resemble a boot.

See also
List of lakes in Minnesota

References

Lakes of Minnesota
Lakes of Anoka County, Minnesota